This article is about the 2010–11 season in Portuguese football.

Portuguese Clubs' Performance in Europe

Team results

UEFA ranking

Earnings

Results

* For group games in Champions League or Europa League, score in home game is displayed
** For group games in Champions League or Europa League, score in away game is displayed

Domestic league tables

Primeira Liga

Liga de Honra

Portugal national football team

UEFA Euro 2012 qualifying

Qualifying group stage

Qualifying play-offs

References

 
Seasons in Portuguese football
Portuguese football
Football
Football